Shoragel, Shuragel, Shorayel, or The Sultanate of Shoragel  (Russian : Шурагел, Шурагельский султанат, Azerbaijani:Şörəyel sultanlığı) was a sultanate established around 1747, in the period of Afsharid dynasty in Persia. Its area was 1037.91 versts (1181.16 km²), and the population mainly consisted of Turkic tribes of :Azerbaijan.

History 
The sultanate was located in the north-west of Iravan khanate at the foot of Alagoz (Alayaz) mountain. The sultanate was surrounded by the mountains separating the Kartli-Kakheti kingdom from the north, the Talyn and Seyidli-Agsaqqalli districts from the south, and the Pembek (also known as Pambak) province and Abaran districts from the east. The Arpachay River separated the Shorayel sultanate from the Kars pashalyk. The center of the sultanate was Ertik (Artik)

The “Review Book of Iravan Province” shows the existence of 172 villages in Shoragel Sanjak (together with Pambak Province). According to the information given during the reign of Nadir Shah, there were 109 villages in Shoragel district as a part of Iravan khanate. 
 
In 1804, Russian troops invaded Shoragel resulting in the exodus of large portion of the local :Muslim population and the final abolition of the Shoragel sultanate in 1805. Abandoned villages were eventually inhabited by the Armenian population resettled from Ottoman Empire. Those records were mentioned three decades later in the "Review of Russian possessions beyond the Caucasus" printed by Russian State Department for External Trade in 1836. 

Part of the Shoragel residents, mainly Karapapakh Turks, left their lands in the wake of the Russo-Turkish war in 1807 and found refuge in the territories of Iravan khanate and Kars pashalyk.

In 1858, the Department of the General Staff of the Russian Empire notes that the Armenian population of Ottoman Empire and Persia continue moving to the empty territories of Araks, Gokche lake (currently known as Sevan) and Shuragel. Both Araks and Gokche lake were the former territories  of Erivan khanate which was conquered and demolished like Shorayel (or Shoragel) sultanate in the same time period.

Rulers 
 Budaq sultan sultan is the last ruler of the Shoragel sultanate. On October 20, 1805, he signed a document with Pavel Tsitsianov on Shoragel's permanent subordination to Russia in Ganja city. Budag sultan had three sons named Gara Mohammad bey, Hamid bey, Khalil bey.

See also
Treaty of Gulistan
Treaty of Turkmenchay
North Caucasus
South Caucasus
Khanates of the Caucasus
Khanates of the South Caucasus
Russo-Persian Wars
Azerbaijan Democratic Republic
Azerbaijan
Erivan Governorate
Western Azerbaijan

References

Sources 
 

Modern history of Azerbaijan
18th century in Armenia
19th century in Armenia
18th century in Azerbaijan
19th century in Azerbaijan
Former countries in Western Asia
Russo-Persian Wars